The Parliament of Devils was a session of the Parliament of England, held at Coventry in the Benedictine Priory of St Mary's.  The primary reason for summoning Parliament was to pass bills of attainder for high treason against Yorkist nobles, following the Battle of Ludford Bridge.

This Parliament was the 21st Parliament summoned in the reign of King Henry VI of England. It was summoned on 9 October 1459 for its first meeting on 20 November 1459, where Sir Thomas Tresham, knight of the shire for Northamptonshire, was elected Speaker of the House of Commons. The prominent figures condemned at this Parliament were Richard Plantagenet, 3rd Duke of York, who was not invited to Parliament, his sons Edward, Earl of March (the future King Edward IV) and Edmund, Earl of Rutland, as well as Richard Neville, 5th Earl of Salisbury and his son, Richard Neville, 16th Earl of Warwick.

The Parliament was dissolved on 20 December 1459.

References

1459 establishments in England
1459 disestablishments in England
15th-century English parliaments
History of Coventry
History of Warwickshire